This is a list of past and present squadrons of the Royal New Zealand Air Force

Current RNZAF flying squadrons and units

Former RNZAF squadrons

No. 1 Squadron RNZAF Code "SJ" reconnaissance / patrol bomber / Transport
No. 2 Squadron RNZAF Code "UH" reconnaissance /patrol bomber / Territorial Fighter Bomber
No. 4 Squadron RNZAF Code "YZ" reconnaissance / patrol bomber
No. 7 Squadron RNZAF Code "UW" reconnaissance / patrol bomber
No. 8 Squadron RNZAF – reconnaissance / patrol bomber
No. 9 Squadron RNZAF – reconnaissance / patrol bomber
No. 10 Squadron RNZAF – reserve bomber reconnaissance / reconnaissance /patrol bomber / Operational Training Unit
No. 11 Squadron RNZAF – reserve bomber reconnaissance
No. 12 Squadron RNZAF – reserve bomber reconnaissance
No. 13 Squadron RNZAF – reserve bomber reconnaissance
No. 15 Squadron RNZAF – Fighter
No. 16 Squadron RNZAF – Fighter
No. 17 Squadron RNZAF – Fighter
No. 18 Squadron RNZAF – Fighter
No. 19 Squadron RNZAF – Code "ZG" Fighter
No. 20 Squadron RNZAF – Code "UY" Army Co-operation / Fighter
No. 21 Squadron RNZAF – Code "TX" Army Co-operation / Fighter
No. 22 Squadron RNZAF – Code Army Co-operation/ Fighter
No. 23 Squadron RNZAF – Fighter
No. 24 Squadron RNZAF – Fighter
No. 25 Squadron RNZAF - Dive Bomber / Fighter
No. 26 Squadron RNZAF - Fighter
No. 30 Squadron RNZAF - Reserve Fighter Bomber / Dive Bomber 
No. 31 Squadron RNZAF - Reserve Fighter Bomber / Dive Bomber 
No. 41 Squadron RNZAF - Code "SG" Reserve Light Bomber / Transport
No. 43 Squadron RNZAF – Reserve Light Bomber
No 44 Squadron RNZAF  - Reserve Light Bomber
No. 51 Squadron RNZAF – postwar Light Anti-Aircraft (LAA) unit. Previous No. 1 LAA Squadron; change of title c.1954.
No. 52 Squadron RNZAF – postwar Light Anti-Aircraft (LAA) unit. Previously No. 2 LAA Squadron.
No. 60 Squadron RNZAF - Radar 
No. 61 Squadron RNZAF - Radar
No. 62 Squadron RNZAF - Radar
No. 75 Squadron RNZAF Code "AA", "JN" & "YZ" Fighter / Bomber / Heavy Bomber / Fighter Bomber
Navigation and Air Electronics Training Squadron RNZAF
Airframe Reconditioning Squadron RNZAF (RNZAF Base Woodbourne)

Squadrons of the Royal Air Force staffed mainly by New Zealanders   
 75 (NEW ZEALAND) Squadron RAF – heavy bomber; code "AA" & "JN"
 No. 243 Squadron RAF – fighter/transport; code "SN" & "VM"
 No. 258 Squadron RAF – fighter; code "FH" & "ZT"

Article XV squadrons

485 Squadron – fighter; code "OU"
486 Squadron – night fighter & fighter bomber; code "SA" 
487 Squadron – bomber/fighter bomber; code "EG"
488 Squadron – fighter/night fighter; code "NF" & "ME" 
489 Squadron  – torpedo bomber; code "P6" & "XA"
490 Squadron – flying boats; code/s unknown

Other RNZAF units 

Northern Group, Central Group, Southern Group (in New Zealand)
No. 1 (Islands) Group RNZAF
General Service Training School 
Command Training School 
Ground Training Wing

World War II

Wartime squadrons

New Zealand Embedded Squadrons in the Royal Air Force

See also
Structure of the Royal New Zealand Air Force

References

 
New Zealand Air Force squadrons
New Zealand military-related lists